Concourse House was a 1960s high-rise tower block in the city of Liverpool, England, designed by the architect Richard Seifert.  The tower was used as a backdrop to the performance art piece La Princesse. The building was built in the 1960s but was demolished in 2009, together with the shops in front of Lime Street Railway Station as part of the Lime Street Gateway development scheme.

References

Buildings and structures in Liverpool
Demolished buildings and structures in Liverpool
Buildings and structures demolished in 2009
Former skyscrapers